Philip A. Cresey Jr. is an American politician from Maine. A Republican from Baldwin, Maine, Cresey served 4 terms (2000–2007) in the Maine House of Representatives.

Cresey was known for his criticism of then Governor Angus King's proposal to give every middle school student in Maine a laptop for school use. Cresey worked with Rep. Brian Duprey to break Maine's contract with Apple Computer and stop the laptop program.

References

Year of birth missing (living people)
Living people
People from Baldwin, Maine
Republican Party members of the Maine House of Representatives